Sean Porter may refer to:

 Sean Porter (American football) (born 1991), American football player
 Sean Porter (cinematographer) (fl. 2010s), American cinematographer
 Sean Porter, American football player and coach in the film Gridiron Gang

See also
Shawn Porter (born 1987), American professional boxer
Seán Powter (born 1997), Irish Gaelic footballer